Henry Davis was a Christian cleric born in East Hampton, New York, on September 15, 1771. He was the second president of Middlebury College in Vermont, serving from 1809 to 1818. He later became president of Hamilton College. He died in Clinton, New York, on March 9, 1852.

External links
Middlebury College

American Christian clergy
1771 births
1852 deaths
Hamilton College (New York)
Presidents of Middlebury College
People from East Hampton (town), New York